The ITF Women's Circuit is the second tier tour for women's professional tennis organised by the International Tennis Federation, and is the tier below the WTA Tour. In 2008, the ITF Women's Circuit included tournaments with prize money ranging from $10,000 up to $100,000.

This article covers the ITF tour from the month of July until September.

Schedule

Key

July

August

September

See also
2008 ITF Women's Circuit (January–March)
2008 ITF Women's Circuit (April–June)

References

External links
International Tennis Federation (ITF) official website

2008 ITF Women's Circuit 07-09